Adhikari (Devanāgarī: अधिकारी, Sinhala: අදිකාරී) (also spelled Adhikary or Adhicary) belongs to Brahmins, Rajput, Rajbangshi caste native to the Indian subcontinent, mainly found in Nepal, India, and Sri Lanka.Adhikari of Kumaon region of Uttarakhand are Rajputs,but it also depends on region. Another regions, majorly West Bengal, Adhikari are Brahmins. It is found among several groups including  Bengalis, Biharis, Sinhalese, Marathis, Nepalese and Kumaonis. Adhikari is literally translated as Officer.

Notable people

People with this surname include:
 Anil Adhikari, Nepalese rapper better known by his stage name Yama Buddha
 Ayush Adhikari, professional footballer from uttrakhand
 Amrit Bhushan Dev Adhikari, Indian writer from Assam
 Bharat Mohan Adhikari, Nepalese politician
 Deepak Adhikari, Indian film personality, better known as Dev
 Dibyendu Adhikari, Indian politician
 Gangadhar Adhikari, Indian communist leader
 Haribhakta Adhikari, Indian politician
 Hemu Adhikari, Indian cricketer
 Indra Adhikari, Bhutanese journalist in exile
 Keki Adhikari, Nepalese actress
 Khagaraj Adhikari, Nepalese politician from Communist Party of Nepal (Unified Marxist–Leninist)
 Kshetra Pratap Adhikary, Nepalese lyricist
 Man Mohan Adhikari, 31st Prime Minister of Nepal
 Michael Sushil Adhikari, Bangladesh politician
 Miriam Adhikari, South African physician
 Mohamed Adhikari, South African professor
 Mohan Chandra Adhikari, Nepalese communist politician
 Nanda Prasad Adhikari, Nepalese activist
 Narayan Prasad Adhikari, Nepalese politician
 Nisha Adhikari, Nepalese actress and model
 Rabindra Prasad Adhikari, Nepalese politician from CPN UML
 Rajesh Singh Adhikari, Indian soldier
 Ram Nath Adhikari, Nepalese politician
 Rana X. Adhikari, American experimental physicist
 Ranu Devi Adhikari, Nepalese singer
 Sadhan Kumar Adhikari, Indian physics professor
 Saroj Kumar Nath Adhikari, Bangladeshi educationist and political activist
 Shantidas Adhikari, Indian Hindu missionary
 Sisir Adhikari, Indian politician
 Suvendu Adhikari, Indian politician

References 

Bengali Hindu surnames
Surnames of Nepalese origin
Nepali-language surnames
Sinhalese surnames
Khas surnames